Nan O' the Backwoods is a 1915 American silent film produced by Sid Films and distributed by Lubin Manufacturing Company. It was directed by Sidney Olcott with Valentine Grant and Walter Chappen in the leading roles.

Cast
 Valentine Grant as Nan Peters
 Walter Chappen as Gilbert Martin
 James Vincent as Dr Brenton
 Pat O'Malley as Lige Peters (credited as P.H. O'Malley)
 Roy Sheldon as Nan's Father

External links

 Nan O' the Backwoods at website dedicated to Sidney Olcott

1915 films
Silent American drama films
American silent short films
Films directed by Sidney Olcott
1915 short films
1915 drama films
Lubin Manufacturing Company films
American black-and-white films
1910s American films
1910s English-language films
English-language drama films
American drama short films